is a Japanese, 12-episode anime adaptation of the H-game of the same name. A non-canon sequel exists to the story as a thirteenth episode, which was released at a later date. This 'Episode 13' is unlicensed and not included in the US release.

Media Blasters licensed Green Green for distribution in North America, and the first volume was released on May 16, 2006. They have since released the 12 TV episodes on three DVDs, first separately throughout 2006, and then in two different budget collections in 2007 (the original single volumes in a box) and 2009 (the three discs in one "Litebox" case). The series premiered in the U.S. television in January 2016 on the channel Toku.

Story
Green Green takes place in the countryside of Japan, at the isolated all-boys boarding school of Kanenone Gakuen (translated literally in English as "Sound of the Bell Academy"). Since there are no females for miles, the school is advertised as the "last remaining paradise for men on Earth". The Kanenone school board has begun talks to merge with an all-girls boarding school, in hopes of becoming a co-ed boarding school. This has the hormone-driven, girl-deprived male body of Kanenone thrilled.

Both schools decide to have a test run of sorts, having the girls from the all-girls school stay at Kanenone for a month, in order to see how the boys and girls can get along with one another. Yuusuke Takazaki, the main character, has his hands full with his "perverted" roommates, nicknamed the Baka ("Idiot") Trio. The Baka Trio - which consists of Bacchi-Gū, an overweight shameless pervert, Ichiban-Boshi, a self-proclaimed ladies man, and Tenjin, a gentle giant who has a "little sister" fetish - are incredibly excited that there will be girls around at their school.

When the buses containing the girls arrive, one girl named Midori Chitose excitedly disembarks first, leaping at and happily hugging a confused Yuusuke. Who is Midori and how does she know Yuusuke? The series focuses on answering this question and the antics of the Baka Trio.

Characters

The main male lead, Yuusuke is perhaps the most "normal" of the boys at Kanenone. He is friends with the Baka Trio, but does not share their more perverted interests. Despite this, the Baka Trio consider Yuusuke to be a member of their group, and he usually finds himself forced or dragged along into involvement with their less-than-wholesome activities.
Yuusuke is implied to be the reincarnation of the boy from the tale of ill-fated lovers mentioned at the start of every episode, with Midori as his partner. However, Yuusuke appears to have no recollection of his past, and initially responds to Midori's affectionate advances by either pushing her away or treating her harshly. Only after recovering his past memories does he fall in love with her. Yuusuke also finds himself liking the tomboyish Futaba Kutsuki, creating a love triangle between the three main characters.
 

Tadatomo is the overweight, long haired, leader and most perverted member of the Baka Trio who has no shame. The arrival of beautiful girls to Kanenone seems to send him out of control. He does things such as drinking the bath water the girls recently bathed in, to making a nipple print of his own nipples so he can imagine they belong to a girl. Bacchi-Gū is considered to be the lead comic relief of the series and is the male mascot of Green Green.

Literally translated in English as "number one shining star," Ichiban-Boshi believes himself to be a suave ladies man. He has a book of pick-up lines to use on his new female classmates, but he always fails and makes a fool of himself. He is the least perverted member of the Baka Trio.

Tenjin is the gentle giant of the Baka Trio. He has an odd fetish. He dreams of having Sanae consider him a big brother, and then she will sleep next to him... while he smells her and eats rice at the same time (a joke referring to the word okazu, which means both "meal" and "porn"). Sanae's young appearance makes him instantly attracted to her, but Sanae wants nothing to do with Tenjin.

The main female lead, Midori is an outgoing and cheerful girl who seems to know Yuusuke and is in love with him. She seems willing to do anything for him, even filling out a form of perverted questions the Baka Trio gave her, hoping it will please Yuusuke. In the opening scene of the series, Midori narrates a tale about two people who were in love, but their love was forbidden at the time and they could not stay together. They promised each other to meet again in another life, hinting that Midori is the girl from the tale and somehow retained her memories, while Yuusuke is the boy from the tale, but he has not retained the memories of his past life. She is also noted to have D-cup breasts. She seemingly has no grasp at the effects some of her antics have wrought, such as climbing on top of a bedridden Yuusuke in the nurses' office while in lingerie, and hanging on to his arm after class ended. Her given name means "green" in Japanese, probably in reference to the name "Green Green".

Futaba plays the role of the tough, boy-hating tsundere. She is less than enthusiastic about the co-ed trial run of the schools, and acts as the self-appointed protector of the girls against the boys of Kanenone. She is particularly disgusted by the antics of the Baka Trio, and does not hesitate to resort to physical violence against them as punishment for their indiscretions. After the Baka Trio pulls a humiliating prank on her, she decides to leave Kanenone immediately on her own. She gets lost and injured in the surrounding woods but is rescued by Yuusuke, who carries her back to Kanenone. This act of kindness, along with an earlier display of chivalry by Yuusuke to protect her modesty, sparks feelings inside her for the boy, and Futaba soon finds herself falling in love with Yuusuke. The two become a couple in Episode 13.
Futaba has a younger sister, Wakaba. She is also the main character in the H-game's second sequel, Green Green 3.

Reika is a mysterious person seems to know about the connection between Midori and Yuusuke. She seems to be intent on keeping the two apart, trying to put Futaba and other girls together with Yuusuke instead. She is noted to have E-cup breasts like Chigusa. Reika's motives are explained near the end of the series. Her given name in Japanese means "lovely flower".
Unlike the other characters, Reika was not in the H-game of Green Green. She was created as a new character for the television series.

Wakaba is Futaba's younger sister. She shows a deep respect for Futaba, referring to her as onee-sama ("honored elder sister").
Wakaba is almost always seen carrying around her potted cactus, whom she named Togemura (literally translated as "thorn village"). Like some devoted plant lovers, Wakaba talks to Togemura as if it were a person; what is unusual is that Togemura appears to be able to communicate with Wakaba as well. Wakaba also uses Togemura as a fortune-telling device and as a weapon to defend herself and her friends, magical girl-style.

A friend of Wakaba, Sanae is a weak and shy girl who joins the trip to Kanenone because her doctors believe that the fresh country air will be beneficial to her health. Her need to take medication on a regular basis is highlighted in several episodes.
Sanae has a much younger appearance than the rest of the major female characters. This draws the attention of Tenjin, who has a fetish for "little sister" types. Unfortunately for Tenjin, his unusual and over-enthusiastic advances only frighten Sanae away. It is implied that Sanae begins to develop feelings for Yuusuke after he helps her.

Chigusa is the nurse at the all-girls boarding school. She came along on the trip as the girls' supervisor. The Baka Trio, especially Bacchi-Gū, are enamored by Chigusa's beauty and her E-cup breasts. Although she should be keeping the girls in order, Chigusa is very easy-going and actually encourages the girls to flirt with the boys.

A brash, bespectacled girl with braided hair who has rather vivid bishōnen sexual fantasies. Her apparent role in the anime is to provide comic relief from the side of the girls. Although her physical attributes manage to attract the attentions of the Baka Trio every now and then, the sight of her face is enough to put an end to any perverted thoughts they may have.

OVAs
In 2002, an original video animation (OVA) adaptation of Green Green was released. It had no relation to the television series. It starts off with the same plot, but instead of girls visiting Kanenone, it had a group of boys from Kanenone (Yuusuke, the Baka Trio, and some others) visiting the all-girl boarding school.

Three Character OVA DVDs were also released in Japan under the title Green Green Character DVDs  ; Green Green Character DVD "Sanae & Wakaba" was released 11/19/2003, Green Green Character DVD "Futaba & Chigusa" was released 12/17/2003, and Green Green Character DVD "Midori & Reika" was released 1/21/2004. Each Green Green Character DVD included a short 8-10 minute Yuri story all of which include a sex or nude scene involving the two female title characters, a music video for each of the title characters, and other extras with a total running time of 33–38 minutes each. In the North American Media Blaster's release most of the contents of the Character DVDs can be found as extras on each DVD with the short stories labeled as untranslated E-cup breasts episodes.

An OVA entitled Green Green: Erolutions (グリーングリーンエロリューションズ) was released in 2004 as the thirteenth and concluding episode of the television series. The episode was not included in the United States release.

List of episodes

Music
Opening Theme:
"Guri Guri"
Lyrics by: milktub
Composition by: milktub
Arrangement by: Takehiro Wakabe
Song by: Hiromi Satou

Ending Theme:

Lyrics by: milktub
Composition by: milktub
Arrangement by: Hitoshi Fujima (Elements Garden)
Song by: YURIA

References

Further reading

External links
 

2003 anime television series debuts
2003 Japanese television series endings
2002 Japanese novels
Anime television series based on video games
Kadokawa Dwango franchises
Light novels
MF Bunko J
Romantic comedy anime and manga
School life in anime and manga